Broughton is a village in Tweeddale in the historical county of Peeblesshire in the Scottish Borders council area, in the south of Scotland, in the civil parish of Broughton, Glenholm and Kilbucho and Upper Tweed Community Council. Broughton is on the Biggar Water, near where it flows into the River Tweed. It is about 7 km east of Biggar, and 15 km west of Peebles.

The village has a post office, village store, tea room/bistro, bowling green, tennis courts, a village hall, a petrol station and a garage. Since 1979, the village has been home to Broughton Ales, Scotland's original independent brewery.

Culture

The village is best known as the one-time home of John Buchan. The Biggar Museum Trust runs a museum dedicated to his life in Peebles, moving it from its original home in Broughton. The Museum moved to Biggar, five miles west of Broughton, and is now known as the Biggar and Upper Clydesdale Museum. Broughton is also home to Broughton Place, a private house built in the style of a 17th-century Scottish tower house, which was designed by Basil Spence in 1938 and incorporates decorative reliefs by architectural sculptor Hew Lorimer. The village contains six listed buildings.

Transport
The Symington, Biggar and Broughton Railway had a station and its headquarters here, which was later absorbed into the Caledonian Railway. The line is now closed. The Talla Railway led from here to the Talla Reservoir.

The village is located on the A701 and B7106 roads, and is located at the western end of the John Buchan Way footpath. A bus route operated by Borders Buses links Broughton to Biggar and Peebles.

Notable residents
Sir John Murray of Broughton  (–1777), Jacobite secretary to Prince Charles Edward Stuart ('Bonnie Prince Charlie') during the Jacobite Rising of 1745
Sir David Murray, 4th Baronet (died 1769), Jacobite soldier 
Alexander Murray (1789–1845), MP for Kirkcudbright Stewartry 1838–45
Frederick Boothby (born ), military and paramilitary leader
Michael Strachan (1919-2000), businessman and author

See also
List of places in the Scottish Borders

References

Tweeddale
Villages in the Scottish Borders
Peeblesshire